Wilson C. Flake (February 28, 1906 – February 15, 1977) was an American diplomat who served as the United States Ambassador to Ghana from 1957 to 1960.

He died on February 15, 1977, in Bethesda, Maryland at age 70.

References

1906 births
1977 deaths
Ambassadors of the United States to Ghana
People from Norfolk, Virginia
20th-century American diplomats